Acraea induna, the induna acraea, is a butterfly of the family Nymphalidae. It is found in Malawi, Zambia, Zimbabwe and South Africa. The habitat consists of woodland and montane grassland.

Description
Very similar to Acraea anacreon qv. The wingspan is 29–54 mm for males and 54–62 mm for females.

Subspecies
Acraea induna induna (Malawi, Zambia, Zimbabwe: eastern highlands)
Acraea induna salmontana (Henning & Henning, 1996) (only found in montane sourveld on the ridges of the Soutpansberg in the Limpopo Province)

Taxonomy
It is a member of the Acraea rahira species group.

Biology
Adults are on wing from March to May. There is one generation per year.

The larvae feed on Aeschynomene nodulosa.

Taxonomy
It is a member of the Acraea rahira species group.  But see also Pierre & Bernaud, 2014.

References

External links
Die Gross-Schmetterlinge der Erde 13: Die Afrikanischen Tagfalter. Plate XIII 55 a

induna
Butterflies described in 1895
Butterflies of Africa